Ray Brown (born 3 November 1950) is an Australian former cricketer. He played one first-class match for Tasmania in 1976/77.

See also
 List of Tasmanian representative cricketers

References

External links
 

1950 births
Living people
Australian cricketers
Tasmania cricketers
Cricketers from Tasmania